Silverton is an historic town in Douglas County, Missouri, United States. The GNIS classifies it as a populated place. Although Hilo is listed as a variant name, the two were not at the same location.  

A post office called Silverton was established in 1889, and remained in operation until 1933.

References

Ghost towns in Missouri
Former populated places in Douglas County, Missouri